Enitharmon Press is an independent British publishing house specialising in artists’ books, poetry, limited editions and original prints.

The name of the press comes from the poetry of William Blake: Enitharmon was a character who represented spiritual beauty and poetic inspiration. The press's logo "derives from a Blake woodcut".

Origins

The Press was founded by Alan Clodd in 1967. Sharing a belief with close friend Kathleen Raine in the "sacrificial stresses which seem to be the means by which the vision of outstanding creative spirits is enhanced for the benefit of their fellow beings", Clodd had little faith in the publishing mainstream. Since its founding Enitharmon Press has been distinguished as an independent press whose two major concerns have been the quality of its books (from paper and binding to typesetting and design) and maintaining a "wide-ranging literary culture outside the realm of agents, public relations and television tie-ins".

Under Alan Clodd's stewardship Enitharmon published over 150 titles. Some of the most prestigious include books by Kathleen Raine, David Gascoyne, Vernon Watkins, Samuel Beckett and John Heath-Stubbs.

In 1987, as he neared the age of 70, Clodd passed on the directorship of Enitharmon to Stephen Stuart-Smith. Alongside the poetry list, Stuart-Smith established Enitharmon Editions, now the leading British publisher of collaborations between distinguished artists and authors. Artists include Paula Rego, Gilbert & George, Henri Cartier-Bresson, Jim Dine, Robert Creeley, R. B. Kitaj and Victor Pasmore, and authors Ted Hughes, Thom Gunn, Seamus Heaney and Blake Morrison.

The list of Enitharmon Press, while still specialising in poetry, diversified to include translations, memoirs, fiction and literary criticism. Most notably, translations of Federico García Lorca, Vladimir Mayakovsky, Rainer Maria Rilke and Lao Zi and critical responses to the work of Edward Thomas and Edward Upward.

Notable authors and publications
U. A. Fanthorpe: Christmas Poems
Geoffrey Hill: Clavics
Federico García Lorca: Sonnets of Dark Love
David Gascoyne: New Collected Poems
Anthony Thwaite: Going Out
Maureen Duffy: Pictures From an Exhibition
Paul Muldoon: Songs and Sonnets
Simon Armitage: Still
Edward Upward: An Unmentionable Man
Jeremy Reed: Voodoo Excess
Sean Bonney: Letters Against the Firmament
Edward Dorn: Derelict Air: From Collected Out

Accolades 
Writers published by Enitharmon have been recipients of these awards: 
 Benson Medal (Royal Society of Literature)
 Booker Prize
 Costa Book Award 
 E. M. Forster Award
 Forward Prize for Best Collection
 Forward Prize for Best First Collection 
 Griffin Prize 
 Nobel Prize for Literature 
 Pulitzer Prize
 Queen's Gold Medal for Poetry
 Shakespeare Prize 
 T. S. Eliot Prize
 Whitbread Poetry Award
 WH Smith Literary Award

References

External links
 Official website
 Archival material at 

Small press publishing companies
Book publishing companies of the United Kingdom
Publishing companies established in 1967
Poetry publishers
1967 establishments in the United Kingdom